"Break My Bank" is a song by American hip-hop duo New Boyz featuring Virgin Islands singer Iyaz. It was written by the group with Matt Squire and Damon Sharpe and produced by J. R. Rotem. The song is the lead single from their second studio album, Too Cool to Care.

Composition

"Break My Bank" features an electronic "sugary" beat with synths and strings. The song features Iyaz singing reggae-rhythmed hook, as New Boyz deliver their lines in a "sing-song" style over an electronic beat and pop hooks. The lyrics refer to them "emptying their wallets to keep the attention of their desired girlfriends," through lines such as, "Had to scrape for some change / So I went to the bank / When I see her she was so damn fine like that / So I hit it right back pull out more stacks / She make me wanna break my bank."

Live performances
New Boyz performed the song with Iyaz at WBBM's Summerfest in June 2010.

Charts

Release history

References

2010 singles
Iyaz songs
New Boyz songs
Song recordings produced by J. R. Rotem
Songs written by J. R. Rotem
Songs written by Damon Sharpe
Songs written by Matt Squire
2010 songs
Asylum Records singles